The 1984–85 I-Divisioona season was the 11th season of the I-Divisioona, the second level of Finnish ice hockey. 12 teams participated in the league, and JYP Jyväskylä won the championship. JYP Jyväskylä, KalPa Kuopio, KooKoo, and TuTo Hockey qualified for the promotion/relegation round of the SM-liiga.

Regular season

External links
 Season on hockeyarchives.info

I-Divisioona seasons
2
Fin